USS Arval (SP–1045) was a United States Navy patrol vessel in commission from 1917 to 1919.

Arval was built as a private motorboat of the same name in 1911 by the Stamford Motor Construction Company at Stamford, Connecticut. On 1 November 1917, the U.S. Navy acquired her from her owner, Donald N. Test, for use as a section patrol boat during World War I. She was commissioned the same day at Chicago, Illinois, as USS Arval (SP-1045).

Arval departed Chicago on the day of her commissioning and arrived at Charleston, South Carolina, on 7 November 1917. Assigned to the 6th Naval District section patrol and based at Wilmington, North Carolina, Arval patrolled the coastal waters of North Carolina through the end of World War I.

In January 1919, Arval moved north to New York City. She was decommissioned and returned to her owner on 27 February 1919, and stricken from the Navy List the same day.

References

Department of the Navy Naval History and Heritage Command Online Library of Selected Images: Civilian Ships: Arval (American Motor Boat, 1911). Served as USS Arval (SP-1045) in 1917-1919
NavSource Online: Section Patrol Craft Photo Archive Arval (SP 1045)

Patrol vessels of the United States Navy
World War I patrol vessels of the United States
Ships built in Stamford, Connecticut
1911 ships
Section patrol craft of the United States Navy